The 1934 Pacific hurricane season ran through the summer and fall of 1934. Before the satellite age started in the 1960s, data on east Pacific hurricanes was extremely unreliable. Most east Pacific storms were of no threat to land.

Systems

Possible Tropical Cyclone One

Possible Hurricane Two
On July 18, a possible hurricane existed north of Cape Corrientes.

Hurricane Three
Somewhere south of Acapulco, a tropical cyclone formed on September 16. It headed along the coast, not strengthening much until September 18. It was a hurricane by September 19. For the next three days, it slowly moved through the area south of the Gulf of California. It had weakened to a depression by September 22, whence it made landfall on the Baja California Peninsula and dissipated.

This hurricane caused death and destruction throughout the southern part of the Baja California Peninsula. A large number of people were killed, and many were injured. The hurricane left twenty thousand people homeless and reduced to hunger. Damage was particularly heavy in La Paz, Triunfor, San Antonio, San Bartolo, Miraflores, San José del Cabo, and Cabo San Lucas. Electricity and water utilities were severely disrupted. The hurricane destroyed the area's tomato crop, and severely disrupted sugarcane plantations. It also destroyed a recently finished highway between La Paz and San Bartolo, and flooded mines near San Antonio and Triunfo. The total damage was estimated at 500,000,000 pesos (1934 MXP). The Mexican government sent aid to the affected area, along with the International Red Cross.

Hurricane Four
On October 14, well off the coast of Mexico, a tropical storm was noticed. It headed north towards the Gulf of California, and dissipated October 16.

See also

1934 Atlantic hurricane season
1934 Pacific typhoon season
1930s North Indian Ocean cyclone seasons
 1900–1940 South Pacific cyclone seasons
 1900–1950 South-West Indian Ocean cyclone seasons
 1930s Australian region cyclone seasons

References

1934 in Mexico
Pacific hurricane seasons
1930s Pacific hurricane seasons